Little Truckee Summit, elevation , is a mountain pass in Sierra County, California, on the Great Basin Divide between the Middle Fork Feather River to the west and the Little Truckee River to the east. The pass is traversed by State Route 89 northwest of Truckee and southeast of Sierraville.

See also
Great Basin Divide

References

Landforms of Sierra County, California
Mountain passes of the Sierra Nevada (United States)